Terminal velocity is the speed at which an object falling through an atmosphere ceases to accelerate.

Terminal velocity may also refer to: 

 Terminal Velocity (film), a 1994 film starring Charlie Sheen
 Terminal Velocity (video game), a flight action shooter game
 Terminal Velocity (novel), a novel by Blanche McCrary Boyd
 Terminal Velocity (album), an album by John Petrucci
 Terminal Velocity, a level in the video game Sonic Colors

See also 
 Terminal (disambiguation)